Elena Moskalová-Poláková (born 20 April 1948) is a Czech volleyball player. She competed at the 1968 Summer Olympics and the 1972 Summer Olympics.

References

1948 births
Living people
Czech women's volleyball players
Olympic volleyball players of Czechoslovakia
Volleyball players at the 1968 Summer Olympics
Volleyball players at the 1972 Summer Olympics
Sportspeople from Jablonec nad Nisou